Fountain is an unincorporated community in the historic Moredock Precinct of Monroe County, Illinois, United States, located just off Bluff Road in the American Bottoms, situated next to the levees lining Fountain Creek as it makes its way west toward the Mississippi River.

Unincorporated communities in Monroe County, Illinois
Unincorporated communities in Illinois
Metro East